José Abreu (1910 – death date unknown) was a Cuban Negro league baseball player who primarily played second base.

A native of Havana, Cuba, Abreu played for the independent Cuban Stars (East) in 1934 and 1935. In 15 recorded games, he homered and posted seven hits in 61 plate appearances.

References

External links
 and Seamheads

1910 births
Date of birth missing
Year of death missing
Place of death missing
Cuban Stars (East) players
Baseball infielders
Baseball players from Havana